The Holyhead Urban District, was an urban district of Wales, established in 1894 and abolished in 1974.

External links 
 Holyhead Urban District Council Records

Urban districts of Wales
Holyhead
History of Anglesey